Symphony Taylor (born August 1, 1980) is an American hip hop producer, radio personality, and official DJ for GZA of the Wu-Tang Clan.
Symphony has worked with artists such as Digital Underground, Tony Touch, DJ Boogie Blind, DJ Scratch from EPMD, The Beatnuts, Sean Price, P. Diddy, Nas, MF Doom, Alchemists, Mobb Deep, Portia Dee, Rick Ross, KRS-One, 2 Chainz, Busta Rhymes, Snoop Dogg, Yelawolf, Onyx, 9th Wonder, B2K's Raz-B and B-Nasty

Early life 
Born and raised in Newark, New Jersey, DJ Symphony started deejaying at age 9 when his older brothers requested him to be the DJ for their rap group New Poet Society.  He played local parties in the New Jersey area and was mentored in the craft by the late DJ Kashief, who was also a popular deejay in the New Jersey area at the time.  DJ Symphony started making mixtapes by age 12, and used whatever money he made selling mixtapes to help him buy more vinyl records. DJ Symphony began his professional career in 1995 deejaying in nightclubs, restaurants, colleges and block parties in the New Jersey and New York area.

Career

Radio 

DJ Symphony became a radio DJ for 103.3 WPRB in Princeton, New Jersey in 1996 and ran a weekly program called Vibes and Vapours.  In 1997, he also started to deejay for Rutgers University and did their Black Madness events. Although DJ Symphony devoted most of his time from 2000 and onward to tour deejaying for numerous artists, he returned to radio in 2007 and worked for 102.5 KSFM in Sacramento, California as a mix show DJ for the show Club 102 which aired from 12am-2am every weekend until 2009. In 2010, DJ Symphony became the program director for Radio Invasion 93.1FM a clear channel radio station.

Tour DJ for the Gza of the Wu-Tang Clan 

In 2000, DJ Symphony was introduced to the Wu-Tang Clan through Raekwon. He started doing shows as Raekwon's tour DJ and in the years to come, he became official tour DJ for Gza of the Wu-Tang Clan, the other DJs being DJ Mathematics, DJ Dice and DJ Saki. DJ Symphony has toured with members of the Wu-Tang Clan on both domestic and international tours. 
DJ Symphony was the official DJ for Raekwon from 2006 to 2013 and worked with Raekwon's label Ice H2O Records from 2006 to 2010. DJ Symphony also worked with Ghostface Killah on his Wu-Block Tour from 2010 to 2013. Since 2014, DJ Symphony has worked as the official tour DJ for GZA.
        
Shows and tours by dates (this list is not exhaustive): 
 2020 Liquid Swords 25th Anniversary U.S Tour
 2019 GZA European Tour
 2018 GZA European Tour
 2017 GZA Australian Tour
 2017 GZA at the Beachland Ballroom, Cleveland 
 2017 GZA at the Howard Theatre, Washington  
 2016 GZA at the Novo in Los Angeles 
 2016 GZA at Brighton Music Hall, Boston 
 2016 GZA at the Observatory, San Diego 
 2016 GZA at The Observatory North Park in San Diego
 2015 Wu-Tang Clan Sneaker Pimps Miami
 2015 GZA at Whatever Fest, Houston 
 2015 GZA at the Untapped Festival 
 2014 GZA concert at São Paulo, Brazil 
 2014 Wu-Block Tour 
 2014 GZA Agenda Music Festival – Chile 
 2013 Wu-Tang Clan Rock the Bells Festival Tour
 2013 GZA at Echo Stage, Washington D.C. 
 2013 Ghostface Killah and Sheek Louch at the Shine, Chicago 
 2013 New Year's Eve Party with DJ LORD (of Public Enemy)
 2012 Wu-Tang Clan Rock the Bells Festival Tour
 2012 Cannibus Cup Tour 
 2012 Wu-Block Tour
 2012 Wu Legends Tour 
 2012 Monegros Desert Festival
 2011 2 Chainz, Raekwon at Rock the Bells, Philadelphia PA 
 2011 Wu-Tang Clan Rock the Bells Festival Tour 
 2011 Raekwonn: Shaolin Vs. Wu Tang Tour 
 2011 Raekwon LA Shaolin Vs. Wu-Tang Tour 
 2011 Raekwon, Ghostface Killah and Cappadonna at House of Blues, Chicago 
 2011 Raekwon Cuban Linx 2 Tour, Dublin, Ireland
 2011 Wu-Block Tour with Ghostface Killah, Sheek Louch
 2010 Raekwon, Capone N Noreaga at Filmore, Irving Plaza, New York City
 2010 Raekwon at Sneaker Pimps, Chicago 
 2010 Raekwon All Tomorrow's Party, New York City
 2010 Raekwon at the Paid Dues Festival, Los Angeles 
 2010 Raekwon at the Open Air Frauenfeld Festival
 2009 Raekwon House of Blues Tour

Educator 
DJ Symphony has evolved from being a hip-hop practitioner to becoming a music teacher. His passion for education and hip-hop lead him to create the Symphony DJ Academy at the Solano Town Center in 2013 in Fairfield, California where he teaches deejaying, audio production, podcasting and radio arts. In 2017 he opened Scratch Course, an online DJ program.

Production credits 
DJ Symphony started his professional production career in 2006 when he was signed with Raekwon's Ice H2O Records label. The label put out the song "Papito" with JD Era and opened up the door for DJ Symphony to produce for other celebrity artists. Listed below are some of the songs that DJ Symphony has produced, although the list is not exhaustive:
 All the way good - Capone (CNN)
 Papito- Ceazar and Reason featuring JD Era
 Heart of Fire - Raekwon
 The Rock - Cappadonna
 Live Your Fantasy - Portia Dee
 The Water - Hanz On
 W.A.R - Hanz On
 Circle Back - B-Nasty
 Anti Mumble Rap featuring Sadat X & Ceazar
 Real Hip-Hop - Jeru the Damaja, Psycho Les & Sadat X

Discography 

DJ Symphony's most notable mixtape series was created in 2010 The Certified Crack Mixtape Series with Raekwon. Overall, the Certified Crack Mixtape Series has had over 1 million downloads. In total, there are 20 Mixtapes in circulation.

Singles
2019: Anti Mumble Rap (featuring Sadat X & Ceazar)
2020: Real Hip-Hop (featuring Jeru the Damaja, Psycho Les & Sadat X)

Mixtapes
2010: Certified Crack: Vial 1 (hosted by Raekwon)
2011: Certified Crack: Vial 2 (hosted by Raekwon)
2011: Certified Crack: Memorial Weekend (hosted by Raekwon)
2011: Messy Sheets
2011: Fight For The Carter: Wayne Vs Shawn
2012: 365 Takeova Series: 2-10-12 (hosted by DJ Symphony & DJ Dames Nellas) 
2012: 365 Takeova Series: 3-16-12 (hosted by DJ Symphony & DJ Dames Nellas)
2012: I Love Canada
2012: Dipset Vs Wu-Tang
2012: I Love America2012: Certified Crack: Common Vs Drake2012: I Am Trayvon Martin2012: Certified Crack: Waka Flocka Vs Wiz Khalifa2012: Certified Crack: MMG Vs YMCMB2014: Certified Crack: The Best Of Superwoman (hosted by Lil' Mo)2018: Wu-Invasion Mixtape Series: Australian Edition Volume 1 (hosted by GZA)
2018: Wu-Invasion Mixtape Series: World Edition Volume 1 (hosted by Ghostface Killah)
2018: Wu-Invasion Mixtape Series: World Edition Volume 2 (hosted by Ghostface Killah)
2019: Wu-Invasion Mixtape Series: Valentines Day Massacre (hosted by Ghostface Killah)
2020: Classic Throwback Mixtape Series: Volume 1 (hosted by Faizon Love)

Guest appearances
2010: "The Columbian Necktie" Raekwon (hosted by DJ Symphony)
2010: "Dead or Alive" The Cartel (hosted by DJ Symphony)
2011: "Digital Money" Da Tykoon (hosted by DJ Symphony)
2011: "The Vault" Nino Graye (hosted by DJ Symphony)

 Movie scores 
DJ Symphony helped create the movie score for the film Omerta'' (2012)

References

External links 

 Official website

1980 births
Living people
American hip hop DJs
American hip hop record producers
Musicians from Newark, New Jersey